The Sava Banovina or Sava Banate, was a province (banovina) of the Kingdom of Yugoslavia between 1929 and 1939. It was named after the Sava River and consisted of much of the present-day Croatia (the areas of historical Croatia and Slavonia). Until 1931, it also comprised White Carniola, now part of Slovenia. The capital city of the Sava Banovina was Zagreb.

Borders

According to the 1931 Constitution of the Kingdom of Yugoslavia, 
The Sava Banovina is bounded on the north, as far as the river Mura, by the ... boundary of the Drava Banovina. Thereafter the boundary of this Banovina follows the river Mura, then the State frontier with Hungary to the point where this leaves the Drava; from this point the boundary of the Banovina follows the course of the Drava, then that of the Danube, as far as the northern boundary of the district of Ilok. From this point the boundary of the Banovina leaves the Danube and goes towards the Sava, following the eastern boundaries of the district, of Vukovar, Vinkovci, and Županja; taking in these districts. It then follows the course of the river Sava to the mouth of the river Una, then the course of the river Una as far as the north-eastern boundary of the district of Dvor (south-west of Kostajnica). From this point to the Adriatic (Morlach Channel) the boundary of the Banovina follows the southern boundaries of the districts of Kostajnica, Petrinja, Glina, and Gvozd, then the south-eastern boundary of the district of Vojnić and the eastern boundaries of the districts of Slunj, Korenica and Donji Lapac. The boundary then passes along the southern boundary of the districts of Gračac and Gospić, which it includes. From the Adriatic coast the boundary follows the gorge of Ljubač and the canal of Nova Povljana, passes between the islands of Maun and Planik, to rejoin, north of the islands of Olib and Silba, the State frontier on the Adriatic.

History

In 1939, the Sava Banovina was merged with the Littoral Banovina and parts of neighboring provinces to create the Banovina of Croatia. In 1941, the World War II Axis Powers occupied the former area of the Sava Banovina.  Small areas were annexed by Fascist Italy and Hungary with the remainder becoming a part of the Independent State of Croatia. Following World War II, the region was made a part of Croatia within a federal Communist Yugoslavia.

List of Bans
The following is the list of people who held the title of Ban (governor) of Sava Banovina:

(a) = acting

References

The Constitution of the Kingdom of Yugoslavia

20th century in Croatia
Yugoslav Croatia
Banovinas of the Kingdom of Yugoslavia
Former states and territories in Slovenia
1929 establishments in Yugoslavia
1939 disestablishments in Yugoslavia
History of Banovina
History of Lika